Trédion is a commune in the Morbihan department of Brittany in north-western France. The population in 2019 was 1,308. Inhabitants of Trédion are called in French Trédionais.

See also
Communes of the Morbihan department

References

External links

 Mayors of Morbihan Association 

Communes of Morbihan